NHZ can refer to:

 the IATA code for Naval Air Station Brunswick
 the ISO 639-3 code for the Santa María la Alta Nahuatl dialect
 nHz, nanohertz, a frequency of one cycle per 109 seconds (about 32 years)